George Leroy Hill (April 17, 1901 – January 18, 1992) was an American sprint runner who finished fourth in the 200 m at the 1924 Olympic Games. He graduated from University of Pennsylvania in 1925 with a degree in economics.

References

1901 births
1992 deaths
American male sprinters
Olympic track and field athletes of the United States
Athletes (track and field) at the 1924 Summer Olympics